Geir-Inge Sivertsen (born 29 August 1965) is a Norwegian engineer and politician for the Conservative Party. From January to March 2020, he served as the Minister of Fisheries in Erna Solberg's cabinet. He resigned after controversy surrounding his severance prior to becoming minister. He is the mayoral candidate for the Conservative Party of Senja in the 2023 Norwegian local elections.

Sivertsen served as mayor of Lenvik municipality from 2011 to 2019, and has served as State Secretary in the Ministry of Trade and Fisheries from 2019 to 2020. Sivertsen hails from Finnsnes, and graduated as engineer from the Norwegian Institute of Technology. He was elected deputy member of the Storting for the periods 2005–2009 and 2017–2021.

Sivertsen had received double salary after taking over as Minister of Fisheries, by applying for and getting severance pay after his duty as Mayor of Lenvik had ended. This eventually led to his resignation.

References

1965 births
Living people
People from Senja
Norwegian engineers
Norwegian Institute of Technology alumni
Conservative Party (Norway) politicians
Mayors of places in Troms
Deputy members of the Storting
Norwegian state secretaries
Government ministers of Norway